Mariana Bueloni Gonçalves (born ) is a retired Brazilian female artistic gymnast who represented her nation in international competitions.  She participated at the 1995 World Artistic Gymnastics Championships in Sabae, Japan. She also took part at the 1995 Pan American Games in Buenos Aires, Argentina.

References

1980 births
Living people
Brazilian female artistic gymnasts
Gymnasts at the 1995 Pan American Games
Pan American Games competitors for Brazil
Sportspeople from São Paulo
20th-century Brazilian women
21st-century Brazilian women